Bob Morris is a  Papua New Guinean football manager, currently managing Papua New Guinea and Lae City.

Managerial career
In October 2015, Morris was appointed Madang manager, after previously managing Besta PNG United. Ahead of the 2019 Pacific Games, Morris was named manager of Papua New Guinea. In 2020, Morris was appointed manager of Papua New Guinea National Soccer League club Morobe Wawens, after spending the previous season with Laiwaden. In the same year, Morris was appointed manager of Lae City.

References

Year of birth missing (living people)
Living people
Papua New Guinean footballers
Papua New Guinea international footballers
Papua New Guinean football managers
Papua New Guinea national football team managers
Association footballers not categorized by position